Felipe Guadalupe Orucuta Ramirez (born 13 October 1985) is a Mexican professional boxer and is the former WBC FECARBOX bantamweight Champion.

Professional career
In March 2008, Orucuta beat veteran Jorge Romero by T.K.O. to win the WBC FECARBOX bantamweight title. The bout was the main-event of a boxing card at the Arena Adolfo López Mateos in Tlalnepantla, México, Mexico.

In 2019, after a fight against Jonathan 'Titan' Rodriguez, he fell into a coma. After successful emergency surgery performed to remove a blood clot from his brain he was placed in a medically-induced coma.

Professional boxing record

| style="text-align:center;" colspan="8"|36 Wins (30 Knockouts, 6 Decisions), 5 Losses, 0 Draws
|-style="text-align:center; background:#e3e3e3;"
|style="border-style:none none solid solid; "|Res.
|style="border-style:none none solid solid; "|Record
|style="border-style:none none solid solid; "|Opponent
|style="border-style:none none solid solid; "|Type
|style="border-style:none none solid solid; "|Round
|style="border-style:none none solid solid; "|Date
|style="border-style:none none solid solid; "|Location
|style="border-style:none none solid solid; "|Notes
|- align=center
|Loss
|36-5
|align=left| Juan Francisco Estrada
|
|
|
|align=left|
|align=left|
|- align=center
|Win
|36-4
|align=left| Ricardo Roman
|
|
|
|align=left|
|align=left|
|- align=center
|Win
|35-4
|align=left| Edgar Jimenez
|
|
|
|align=left|
|align=left|
|- align=center
|Win
|34-4
|align=left| Juan Jimenez
|
|
|
|align=left|
|align=left|
|- align=center
|Win
|33-4
|align=left| Efrain Perez
|
|
|
|align=left|
|align=left|
|- align=center
|Win
|32-4
|align=left| Yader Cardoza
|
|
|
|align=left|
|align=left|
|- align=center
|Loss
|31-4
|align=left| Jose Cayetano
|
|
|
|align=left|
|align=left|
|- align=center
|Win
|31-3
|align=left| Roberto Pucheta Amador
|
|
|
|align=left|
|align=left|
|- align=center
|Win
|30-3
|align=left| Ricardo Roman
|
|
|
|align=left|
|align=left|
|- align=center
|Loss
|29-3
|align=left| Omar Andres Narvaez
|
|
|
|align=left|
|align=left|
|- align=center
|Win
|29-2
|align=left| Gabriel Pena
|
|
|
|align=left|
|align=left|
|- align=center
|Win
|28-2
|align=left| Javier Gallo
|
|
|
|align=left|
|align=left|
|- align=center
|Loss
|27-2
|align=left| Omar Andres Narvaez
|
|
|
|align=left|
|align=left|
|- align=center
|Win
|27-1
|align=left| Fernando Lumacad
|
|
|
|align=left|
|align=left|
|- align=center
|Win
|26-1
|align=left| Manuel de los Reyes Herrera
|
|
|
|align=left|
|align=left|
|- align=center
|Win
|25-1
|align=left| Julio César Miranda
|
|
|
|align=left|
|align=left|
|- align=center
|Win
|24-1
|align=left| Richard Garcia
|
|
|
|align=left|
|align=left|
|- align=center
|Win
|23-1
|align=left| Roberto Castaneda
|
|
|
|align=left|
|align=left|
|- align=center
|Win
|22-1
|align=left| Devis Perez
|
|
|
|align=left|
|align=left|
|- align=center
|Win
|21-1
|align=left| Jesus Vazquez
|
|
|
|align=left|
|align=left|
|- align=center
|Win
|20-1
|align=left| Julio David Roque Ler
|
|
|
|align=left|
|align=left|
|- align=center
|Win
|19-1
|align=left| Jose Tamayo
|
|
|
|align=left|
|align=left|
|- align=center
|Loss
|18-1
|align=left| Daniel Rosas
|
|
|
|align=left|
|align=left|
|- align=center
|Win
|18-0
|align=left| Enrique Bernache
|
|
|
|align=left|
|align=left|
|- align=center
|Win
|17-0
|align=left| Adan Osuna
|
|
|
|align=left|
|align=left|
|- align=center
|Win
|16-0
|align=left| David Solano
|
|
|
|align=left|
|align=left|
|- align=center
|Win
|15-0
|align=left| Antonio Chabet
|
|
|
|align=left|
|align=left|
|- align=center
|Win
|14-0
|align=left| Fernando Vargas
|
|
|
|align=left|
|align=left|
|- align=center
|Win
|13-0
|align=left| Saul Nava
|
|
|
|align=left|
|align=left|
|- align=center
|Win
|12-0
|align=left| Alvaro Muro
|
|
|
|align=left|
|align=left|
|- align=center
|Win
|11-0
|align=left| Jorge Romero
|
|
|
|align=left|
|align=left|
|- align=center
|Win
|10-0
|align=left| Adolfo Arrellano
|
|
|
|align=left|
|align=left|
|- align=center
|Win
|9-0
|align=left| Eduardo Avaca
|
|
|
|align=left|
|align=left|
|- align=center
|Win
|8-0
|align=left| Levi Perez
|
|
|
|align=left|
|align=left|
|- align=center
|Win
|7-0
|align=left| Rutilo Jimenez
|
|
|
|align=left|
|align=left|
|- align=center
|Win
|6-0
|align=left| Mauricio Cervantes
|
|
|
|align=left|
|align=left|
|- align=center
|Win
|5-0
|align=left| Gabriel Lopez
|
|
|
|align=left|
|align=left|
|- align=center
|Win
|4-0
|align=left| Gabriel Lopez
|
|
|
|align=left|
|align=left|
|- align=center
|Win
|3-0
|align=left| Ricardo Ocadiz
|
|
|
|align=left|
|align=left|
|- align=center
|Win
|2-0
|align=left| Luis Eduardo Perez
|
|
|
|align=left|
|align=left|
|- align=center
|Win
|1-0
|align=left| Christian Hernandez
|
|
|
|align=left|
|align=left|

References

External links

Boxers from the State of Mexico
Bantamweight boxers
1985 births
Living people
Mexican male boxers